Miguel Timm (born 31 January 1992) is a South African football midfielder who currently plays for Orlando Pirates.

Career
Timm was born in Durban, South Africa, but was raised in Johannesburg. His youth career began in a suburb in South Johannesburg called Mondeor. 

He soon started to attract the likes of Orlando Pirates FC and SuperSport United F.C. academies. After a brief stint with Orlando Pirates FC U-12's he went to play in Ajax Cape Town F.C.'s development. 

Miguel's professional playing career started with Bidvest Wits FC between 2011 and 2014 and then for Mpumalanga Black Aces F.C. from 2014 to 2015. Timm played in the United States with Phoenix Rising between 2016 and 2018. After returning to South Africa he played for Chippa United, Maritzburg United and Marumo Gallants.

On 5 November 2022, Timm won the 2022 MTN 8 with Orlando Pirates after defeating AmaZulu in the final, with Timm named man of the match.

References

External links

1992 births
Living people
Soccer players from Durban
South African soccer players
Association football midfielders
South African Premier Division players
USL Championship players
Bidvest Wits F.C. players
Mpumalanga Black Aces F.C. players
Phoenix Rising FC players
Chippa United F.C. players
Maritzburg United F.C. players
Marumo Gallants F.C. players
Orlando Pirates F.C. players